Angijak Island is an uninhabited island in the Qikiqtaaluk Region of Nunavut, Canada. It is located in Davis Strait, off southeastern Baffin Island's Cumberland Peninsula. Other islands in the immediate vicinity include Akuglek Island, Kekertaluk Island, Kekertuk Island, and Nuvuktik Island.

References

Islands of Baffin Island
Islands of Davis Strait
Uninhabited islands of Qikiqtaaluk Region